Larry Marek (born 1940) is a Democratic politician, representing the 89th District in the Iowa House of Representatives since 2008. From Washington County, Iowa, Marek served in the Iowa National Guard for eight years. He went to the University of Iowa on a farm operation program. Marek was a farmer and was involved with the banking business.

References

External links
 

1940 births
Living people
Businesspeople from Iowa
Farmers from Iowa
People from Washington County, Iowa
Iowa State University alumni
Democratic Party members of the Iowa House of Representatives